Criticism of the Quran is an interdisciplinary field of study concerning the factual accuracy of the claims and the moral tenability of the commands made in the Quran, the holy book of Islam. The Quran is viewed to be the scriptural foundation of Islam and is believed by Muslims to have been sent down by God (Allah) and revealed to Muhammad by the angel Jabreel (Gabriel). It has been subject to criticism both in the sense of being studied by mostly secular Western scholars and in being found fault with.

In "critical-historical study" scholars (such as John Wansbrough, Joseph Schacht, Patricia Crone, Michael Cook) seek to investigate and verify the Quran's origin, text, composition, history, examining questions, puzzles, difficult text, etc. as they would non-sacred ancient texts. The most common criticisms concern various pre-existing sources that Quran relies upon, internal consistency, clarity and ethical teachings. According to Toby Lester, many Muslims find not only the religious fault-finding but also Western scholarly investigation of textual evidence "disturbing and offensive".

Historical authenticity

Traditional view
According to Islamic tradition, the Quran is the literal word of God as recited to the Islamic prophet Muhammad through the angel Gabriel. Muhammad, according to tradition, recited perfectly what the archangel Gabriel revealed to him for his companions to write down and memorize.

The early Arabic script transcribed 28 consonants, of which only 6 can be readily distinguished, the remaining 22 having formal similarities which means that what specific consonant is intended can only be determined by context. It was only with the introduction of Arabic diacritics some centuries later, that an authorized vocalization of the text, and how it was to be read, was established and became canonical.

Prior to this period, there is evidence that the unpointed text could be read in different ways, with different meanings. Tabarī prefaces his early commentary on the Quran illustrating that the precise way to read the verses of the sacred text was not fixed even in the day of the Prophet. Two men disputing a verse in the text asked Ubay ibn Ka'b to mediate, and he disagreed with them, coming up with a third reading. To resolve the question, the three went to Muhammad. He asked first one-man to read out the verse, and announced it was correct. He made the same response when the second alternative reading was delivered. He then asked Ubay to provide his own recital, and, on hearing the third version, Muhammad also pronounced it 'Correct!'. Noting Ubay's perplexity and inner thoughts, Muhammad then told him, 'Pray to God for protection from the accursed Satan.'

Comparison with biblical narratives

The Quran mentions more than 50 people previously mentioned in the Bible, which predates it by several centuries. Stories related in the Quran usually focus more on the spiritual significance of events than details. The stories are generally comparable, but there are differences. One of the most famous differences is the Islamic view of Jesus' crucifixion. The Quran maintains that Jesus was not actually crucified and did not die on the cross. The general Islamic view supporting the denial of crucifixion is similar to Manichaeism (Docetism), which holds that only Jesus body was crucified but not his spirit, while concluding that Jesus will return during the end-times.

Earliest witness testimony
The last recensions to make an official and uniform Quran in a single dialect were effected under Caliph Uthman (644–656) starting some twelve years after the Prophet's death and finishing twenty-four years after the effort began, with all other existing personal and individual copies and dialects of the Quran being burned:

It is traditionally believed the earliest writings had the advantage of being checked by people who already knew the text by heart, for they had learned it at the time of the revelation itself and had subsequently recited it constantly. Since the official compilation was completed two decades after Muhammad's death, the Uthman text has been scrupulously preserved. Bucaille believed that this did not give rise to any problems of this Quran's authenticity.

Regarding who was the first to collect the narrations, and whether or not it was compiled into a single book by the time of Muhammad's death is contradicted by witnesses living when Muhammad lived, several historical narratives appear:

Zaid b. Thabit said:

It is reported... from Ali who said:

It is reported... from Ibn Buraidah who said:

Extant copies prior to Uthman version

Sanaa manuscript

The Sana'a manuscript contains older portions of the Quran showing variances different from the Uthman copy. The parchment upon which the lower codex of the Sana'a manuscript is written has been radiocarbon dated with 99% accuracy to before 671 CE, with a 95.5% probability of being older than 661 CE and 75% probability from before 646 CE. The Sana'a palimpsest is one of the most important manuscripts of the collection in the world. This palimpsest has two layers of text, both of which are Quranic and written in the Hijazi script. While the upper text is almost identical with the modern Qurans in use (with the exception of spelling variants), the lower text contains significant diversions from the standard text. For example, in sura 2, verse 87, the lower text has wa-qaffaynā 'alā āthārihi whereas the standard text has wa-qaffaynā min ba'dihi. The Sana'a manuscript has exactly the same verses and the same order of verses as the standard Quran. The order of the suras in the Sana'a codex is different from the order in the standard Quran. Such variants are similar to the ones reported for the Quran codices of Companions such as Ibn Masud and Ubay ibn Ka'b. However, variants occur much more frequently in the Sana'a codex, which contains "by a rough estimate perhaps twenty-five times as many [as Ibn Mas'ud's reported variants]".

Birmingham/Paris manuscript

In 2015, the University of Birmingham disclosed that scientific tests may show a Quran manuscript in its collection as one of the oldest known and believe it was written close to the time of Muhammad. The findings in 2015 of the Birmingham Manuscripts lead Joseph E. B. Lumbard, Assistant Professor of Classical Islam, Brandeis University, to comment:

Tests by the Oxford Radiocarbon Accelerator Unit indicated with a probability of more than 94 percent that the parchment dated from 568 to 645. Dr Saud al-Sarhan, Director of Center for Research and Islamic Studies in Riyadh, questions whether the parchment might have been reused as a palimpsest, and also noted that the writing had chapter separators and dotted verse endings – features in Arabic scripts which are believed not to have been introduced to the Quran until later. Al-Sarhan's criticisms was affirmed by several Saudi-based experts in Quranic history, who strongly rebut any speculation that the Birmingham/Paris Quran could have been written during the lifetime of the Prophet Muhammad. They emphasize that while Muhammad was alive, Quranic texts were written without chapter decoration, marked verse endings or use of coloured inks; and did not follow any standard sequence of surahs. They maintain that those features were introduced into Quranic practice in the time of the Caliph Uthman, and so the Birmingham leaves could have been written later, but not earlier.

Professor Süleyman Berk of the faculty of Islamic studies at Yalova University has noted the strong similarity between the script of the Birmingham leaves and those of a number of Hijazi Qurans in the Turkish and Islamic Arts Museum, which were brought to Istanbul from the Great Mosque of Damascus following a fire in 1893. Professor Berk recalls that these manuscripts had been intensively researched in association with an exhibition on the history of the Quran, The Quran in its 1,400th Year held in Istanbul in 2010, and the findings published by François Déroche as Qur'ans of the Umayyads in 2013. In that study, the Paris Quran, BnF Arabe 328(c), is compared with Qurans in Istanbul, and concluded as having been written "around the end of the seventh century and the beginning of the eighth century."

In December 2015 Professor François Déroche of the Collège de France confirmed the identification of the two Birmingham leaves with those of the Paris Qur'an BnF Arabe 328(c), as had been proposed by Dr Alba Fedeli. Prof. Deroche expressed reservations about the reliability of the radiocarbon dates proposed for the Birmingham leaves, noting instances elsewhere in which radiocarbon dating had proved inaccurate in testing Qurans with an explicit endowment date; and also that none of the counterpart Paris leaves had yet been carbon-dated. Jamal bin Huwaireb, managing director of the Mohammed bin Rashid Al Maktoum Foundation, has proposed that, were the radiocarbon dates to be confirmed, the Birmingham/Paris Qur'an might be identified with the text known to have been assembled by the first Caliph, Abu Bakr, between 632 and 634 CE.

Further research and findings
Critical research of historic events and timeliness of eyewitness accounts reveal the effort of later traditionalists to consciously promote, for nationalistic purposes, the centrist concept of Mecca and prophetic descent from Ismail, in order to grant a Hijazi orientation to the emerging religious identity of Islam:

In their book 1977 Hagarism: The Making of the Islamic World, written before more recent discoveries of early Quranic material, Patricia Crone and Michael Cook challenge the traditional account of how the Quran was compiled, writing that "there is no hard evidence for the existence of the Koran in any form before the last decade of the seventh century." Crone, Wansbrough, and Nevo argued, that all the primary sources which exist are from 150 to 300 years after the events which they describe, and thus are chronologically far removed from those events.

It is generally acknowledged that the work of Crone and Cook was a fresh approach in its reconstruction of early Islamic history, but the theory has been almost universally rejected. Van Ess has dismissed it stating that "a refutation is perhaps unnecessary since the authors make no effort to prove it in detail ... Where they are only giving a new interpretation of well-known facts, this is not decisive. But where the accepted facts are consciously put upside down, their approach is disastrous." R. B. Serjeant states that "[Crone and Cook's thesis]... is not only bitterly anti-Islamic in tone, but anti-Arabian. Its superficial fancies are so ridiculous that at first one wonders if it is just a 'leg pull', pure 'spoof'." Francis Edward Peters states that "Few have failed to be convinced that what is in our copy of the Quran is, in fact, what Muhammad taught, and is expressed in his own words".

In 2006, legal scholar Liaquat Ali Khan claimed that Crone and Cook later explicitly disavowed their earlier book. Patricia Crone in an article published in 2006 provided an update on the evolution of her conceptions since the printing of the thesis in 1976. In the article she acknowledges that Muhammad existed as a historical figure and that the Quran represents "utterances" of his that he believed to be revelations. However she states that the Quran may not be the complete record of the revelations. She also accepts that oral histories and Muslim historical accounts cannot be totally discounted, but remains skeptical about the traditional account of the Hijrah and the standard view that Muhammad and his tribe were based in Mecca. She describes the difficulty in the handling of the hadith because of their "amorphous nature" and purpose as documentary evidence for deriving religious law rather than as historical narratives.

The author of the Apology of al-Kindy Abd al-Masih ibn Ishaq al-Kindi (not the famed philosopher al-Kindi) claimed that the narratives in the Quran were "all jumbled together and intermingled" and that this was "an evidence that many different hands have been at work therein, and caused discrepancies, adding or cutting out whatever they liked or disliked". Bell and Watt suggested that the variation in writing style throughout the Quran, which sometimes involves the use of rhyming, may have indicated revisions to the text during its compilation. They claimed that there were "abrupt changes in the length of verses; sudden changes of the dramatic situation, with changes of pronoun from singular to plural, from second to third person, and so on". At the same time, however, they noted that "[i]f any great changes by way of addition, suppression or alteration had been made, controversy would almost certainly have arisen; but of that there is little trace." They also note that "Modern study of the Quran has not in fact raised any serious question of its authenticity. The style varies, but is almost unmistakable."

Lack of secondary evidence and textual history 

The traditional view of Islam has also been criticized for the lack of supporting evidence consistent with that view, such as the lack of archaeological evidence, and discrepancies with non-Muslim literary sources. In the 1970s, what has been described as a "wave of skeptical scholars" challenged a great deal of the received wisdom in Islamic studies. They argued that the Islamic historical tradition had been greatly corrupted in transmission. They tried to correct or reconstruct the early history of Islam from other, presumably more reliable, sources such as coins, inscriptions, and non-Islamic sources. The oldest of this group was John Wansbrough (1928–2002). Wansbrough's works were widely noted, but perhaps not widely read. In 1972, a cache of ancient Qurans was discovered in a mosque in Sana'a, Yemen – commonly known as the Sana'a manuscripts. On the basis of studies of the trove of Quranic manuscripts discovered in Sana'a, Gerd R. Puin concluded that the Quran as we have it is a 'cocktail of texts', some perhaps preceding Muhammad's day, and that the text as we have it evolved. However, other scholars, such as Asma Hilali presumed that the San'aa palimpsest seems to be written down by a learning scribe as a form of "exercise" in the context of a "school exercise", which explains a potential reason of variations in this text from the standard Quran Mushafs available today (see Sanaa manuscript for details). Another way to explain these variations is that San'aa manuscript may have been part of a surviving copy of Quranic Mus'haf which escaped the 3rd caliph Uthman's attempt to destroy all the dialects (Ahruf) of Quran except the Quraishi one (in order to unite the Muslims of that time).

Claim of divine origin

Questions about the text
The Quran itself states that its revelations are themselves "miraculous 'signs—inimitable (I'jaz) in their eloquence and perfection 
and proof of the authenticity of Muhammad's prophethood.
 
Several verses remark on how the verses of the book set clear or make things clear, and are in "pure and clear" Arabic language 
At the same time, (most Muslims believe) some verses of the Quran have been abrogated (naskh) by others and these and other verses have sometimes been revealed in response or answer to questions by followers or opponents.

Not all  early Muslims agreed with this consensus. Muslim-turned-skeptic Ibn al-Rawandi (d.911) dismissed the Quran as "not the speech of someone with wisdom, contain[ing] contradictions, errors and absurdities". 
In response to claims that the Quran is a miracle, 10th-century physician and polymath Muhammad ibn Zakariya al-Razi wrote (according to his opponent Abu Hatim Ahmad ibn Hamdan al-Razi),
You claim that the evidentiary miracle is present and available, namely, the Koran. You say: "Whoever denies it, let him produce a similar one." Indeed, we shall produce a thousand similar, from the works of rhetoricians, eloquent speakers and valiant poets, which are more appropriately phrased and state the issues more succinctly. They convey the meaning better and their rhymed prose is in better meter. ... By God what you say astonishes us! You are talking about a work which recounts ancient myths, and which at the same time is full of contradictions and does not contain any useful information or explanation. Then you say: "Produce something like it"?!Abu Hatim al-Razi: The Proof of Prophecy, a Parallel Arabic-English Text - Islamic Translation Series

Early Western scholars also often attacked the literary merit of the Quran. 
Orientalist Thomas Carlyle,  called the Quran "toilsome reading and a wearisome confused jumble, crude, incondite" with "endless iterations, long-windedness, entanglement" and "insupportable stupidity".  Salomon Reinach wrote that this book warrants "little merit ... from a literary point of view".

More specifically, "peculiarities" in the text have been alleged.
Iranian rationalist and scholar Ali Dashti points out that before its perfection became an issue of Islamic doctrine, early Muslim scholar Ibrahim an-Nazzam "openly acknowledged that the arrangement and syntax" of the Quran was less than "miraculous".

Ali Dashti states that "more than one hundred" aberrations from "the normal rules and structure of Arabic have been noted" in the Quran. 
sentences which are incomplete and not fully intelligible without the aid or commentaries; foreign words, unfamiliar Arabic words, and words used with other than the normal meaning; adjectives and verbs inflected without observance of the concords of gender and number; illogically and ungrammatically applied pronouns which sometimes have no referent; and predicates which in rhymed passages are often remote from the subjects. 

Scholar Gerd R. Puin puts the number of unclear verses much higher:
The Koran claims for itself that it is 'mubeen,' or 'clear,' but if you look at it, you will notice that every fifth sentence or so simply doesn't make sense. Many Muslims—and Orientalists—will tell you otherwise, of course, but the fact is that a fifth of the Koranic text is just incomprehensible. This is what has caused the traditional anxiety regarding translation. If the Koran is not comprehensible—if it can't even be understood in Arabic—then it's not translatable. People fear that. And since the Koran claims repeatedly to be clear but obviously is not—as even speakers of Arabic will tell you—there is a contradiction. Something else must be going on.

Scholar of the Semitic languages Theodor Noldeke collected a large quantity of morphological and syntactic grammatical forms in the Quran  that "do not enter into the general linguistic system of Arabic".
Alan Dundes points out the Quran itself denies that there can be errors within it, "If it were from other than Allah, they would surely have found in it many contradictions". (Q.4:82)

Narrative voice: Mohammed or God as speakers

Since the Quran is God's revelation to humanity, critics have wondered why in many verses, God is being addressed by humans, instead of Him addressing human beings. Or as sympathetic Western scholars Richard Bell and W. Montgomery Watt point out, it is not unheard of for someone (especially someone very powerful) to speak of himself in the third person, "the extent to which we find the Prophet apparently being addressed and told about God as a third person, is unusual", as is where "God is made to swear by himself".)

Folklorist Alan Dundes notes how one "formula" or phrase ("... acquit thou/you/them/him of us/your/their/his evil deeds") is repeated with a variety of voices both divine and human, singular and plural:
`Our Lord, forgive Thou our sins and acquit us of our evil deeds` ; 
`We will acquit you of your evil deeds`, ; 
`I will acquit you of your evil deeds`, ;
`He will acquit them of their evil deeds`, ;  
`Allah will acquit him of his evil deeds`, ;

The point-of-view of God changes from third person ("He" and "His" in Exalted is He who took His Servant by night from al-Masjid al-Haram to al-Masjid al- Aqsa),  to first person ("We" and "Our" in We have blessed, to show him of Our signs), and back again to third ("He" in Indeed, He is the Hearing) all in the same verse.  (In Arabic there is no capitalization to indicate divinity.)  Q.33:37 also starts by referring to God in the third person, is followed by a sentence with God speaking in first person (we gave her in marriage ...) before returning to third person (and God's commandment must be performed). Again  in   God is both first (We) and third person (God, His) within one sentence.

The  Jewish Encyclopedia, for example, writes: "For example, critics note that a sentence in which something is said concerning Allah is sometimes followed immediately by another in which Allah is the speaker (examples of this are Q.16.81, 27:61, 31:9, 43:10) Many peculiarities in the positions of words are due to the necessities of rhyme (lxix. 31, lxxiv. 3)." The verse  starts out with Muhammad talking in first person (I) and switches to third (you).
 Shall I seek other than Allah for judge, when He it is Who hath revealed unto you (this) Scripture, fully explained? Those unto whom We gave the Scripture (aforetime) know that it is revealed from thy Lord in truth. So be not thou (O Muhammad) of the waverers.

While some (Muhammad Abdel Haleem) have argued that "such grammatical shifts are a traditional aspect of Arabic rhetorical style",   Ali Dashti (also quoted by critic  Ibn Warraq) notes that in many verses "the speaker cannot have been God". The opening surah Al-Fatiha which contains such lines as 
Praise to God, the Lord of the Worlds, ...You (alone) we worship and from You (alone) we seek help. ...
is  "clearly addressed to God, in the form of a prayer." 

Many (in fact 350) verses in the Quran   where God is addressed in the third person are preceded by the imperative "say/recite!" (qul) -- but it does not occur in Al-Fatiha and many other similar verses. Sometimes the problem is resolved in translations of the Quran by the translators adding "Say!" in front of the verse (Marmaduke Pickthall and N. J. Dawood for Q.27.91, Abdullah Yusuf Ali for Q.6:114).

Dashti notes that in at least one verse  
 -- Exalted is He who took His Servant by night from al-Masjid al-Haram to al-Masjid al-Aqsa, whose surroundings We have blessed, to show him of Our signs. Indeed, He is the Hearing, the Seeing.

This feature did not escape the notice of some early Muslims. 
Ibn Masud — one of the companions of Muhammad who served as a scribe for divine revelations received by  Muhammad and is considered a reliable transmitter of ahadith — did not believe that Surah Fatihah  (or two other surah — 113 and 114 — that contained the phrase "I take refuge in the Lord") to be a genuine part of the Quran. He was not alone, other companions of Muhammad disagreed over which surahs were part of the Quran and which not. A verse of the Quran itself seems to distinguish between Fatihah and the Quran: 
 -- And we have given you seven often repeated verses [referring to the seven verses of Surah Fatihah] and the great Quran. (Al-Quran 15:87)
Al-Suyuti, the noted medieval philologist and commentator of the Quran thought five verses had questionable "attribution to God" and were likely spoken by either Muhammad or Gabriel.

Cases where the speaker is swearing an oath by God, such as surahs 75:1–2 and 90:1, have been made a point of criticism. It is also widely acknowledged that the first-person plural pronoun in Surah 19:64 refers to angels, describing their being sent by God down to Earth. Bell and Watt suggest that this attribution to angels can be extended to interpret certain verses where the speaker is not clear.

Spelling, syntax and grammar
In 2020 article a Saudi website published an article  claiming that while most Muslims believe the text established by third caliph 'Uthman bin 'Affan  "is sacred and must not be amended", there are some 2500 "errors of spelling, syntax and grammar" within it.  The author (Ahmad Hashem) argues that while  the recitation of the Quran is divine, the Quranic script established by Uthman's "is a human invention" subject to error and correction. Examples of some of the errors he gives are:  
Surah 68, verse 6, [the word] بِأَيِّيكُمُ ["which of you"] appears, instead of بأيكم. In other words, an extra ي was added. 
Surah 25, verse 4, [the word] جَآءُو ["they committed"] appears, instead of جَاءُوا or جاؤوا. In other words, the alif in the plural masculine suffix وا is missing.
Surah 28, verse 9, the word  امرأت ["wife"] appears, instead of امرأة.

Phrases, sentences or verse that seem out of place and were likely to have been transposed.
An example of an out-of-place verse fragment is found in Surah 24 where the beginning of a verse — (Q.24:61) "There is not upon the blind [any] constraint nor upon the lame constraint nor upon the ill constraint ..." — is located in the midst of a section describing proper behavior for visiting relations and modesty for women and children  ("when you eat from your [own] houses or the houses of your fathers or the houses of your mothers or the houses of your brothers or the houses of your sisters or ..."). While it makes little sense here, the exact same phrases appears in another surah section (Q.48:11-17) where it does fit in as list of those exempt from blame and hellfire if they do not fight in a jihad military campaign.

Theodor Nöldeke complains that "many sentences begin with a 'when' or 'on the day when' which seems to hover in the air, so that commentators are driven to supply a 'think of this' or some such ellipsis."  Similarly, describing a "rough edge" of the Quran, Michael Cook notes that verse Q.33:37 starts out with a "long and quite complicated subordinate clause"  ("when thou wast saying to him ..."), "but we never learn what the clause is subordinate to."

Grammar

Examples of lapses in grammar include  where the word "performers" should be in the nominative case but instead is in the accusative;  where "these two" of "These two are sorcerers" is in the nominative case (hādhāne) instead of the accusative case (hādhayne); and  where "have started to fight" is in the plural form instead of the dual like the subject of the sentence. Dashti laments that Islamic scholars have traditionally replied to these problems saying "our task is not to make the readings conform to Arabic grammar, but to take the whole of the Quran as it is and make Arabic grammar conform to the Quran."

Reply
A common reply to questions about difficulties or obscurities in the Quran is verse 3:7 which unlike other verses that simply state that the Quran is clear (mubeen) states that some verses are clear but others are "ambiguous".
 It is He who sent down upon thee the Book, wherein are verses clear that are the Essence of the Book, and others ambiguous. As for those in whose hearts is swerving, they follow the ambiguous part, desiring dissension, and desiring its interpretation; and none knows its interpretation, save only God. And those firmly rooted in knowledge say, 'We believe in it; all is from our Lord'; yet none remembers, but men possessed of minds.

In regards to questions about the narrative voice, Al-Zarkashi asserts that "moving from one style to another serves to make speech flow more smoothly", but also that by mixing up pronouns the Quran prevents the "boredom" that a more logical, straight forward narrative induces; it keeps the reader on their toes, helping "the listener to focus, renew[ing] his interest", providing "freshness and variety".  "Muslim specialists" refer to the practice as iltifāt, ("literally 'conversion', or 'turning one's face to). Western scholar Neal Robinson provides a more detailed reasons as to why these are not "imperfections", but instead should be "prized": changing the voice from "they" to "we" provides a "shock effect", third person ("Him") makes God "seem distant and transcendent", first person plural ("we") "emphasizes His majesty and power", first person singular ("I") "introduces a note of intimacy or immediacy", and so on. 
(Critics like Hassan Radwan suggest these explanations are rationalizations.)

Preexisting sources

Sami Aldeeb, Palestinian-born Swiss lawyer and author of many books and articles on Arab and Islamic law, holds the theory that the Quran was written by a rabbi. Günter Lüling asserts that one-third of the Quran has pre-Islamic Christian origins. Puin likewise thinks some of the material predates Muhammad's life.

Scholar Oddbjørn Leirvik states "The Qur'an and Hadith have been clearly influenced by the non-canonical ('heretical') Christianity that prevailed in the Arab peninsula and further in Abyssinia" prior to Islam.

When looking at the narratives of Jesus found in the Quran, some themes are found in pre-Islamic sources such as the Infancy Gospels about Christ. Much of the quranic material about the selection and upbringing of Mary parallels much of the Protovangelium of James, with the miracle of the palm tree and the stream of water being found in the Gospel of Pseudo-Matthew. In Pseudo-Matthew, the flight to Egypt is narrated similarly to how it is found in Islamic lore, with Syriac translations of the Protoevangelium of James and The Infancy Gospel of Thomas being found prior to Islam.

John Wansbrough believes that the Quran is a redaction in part of other sacred scriptures, in particular the Judaeo-Christian scriptures. Herbert Berg writes that "Despite John Wansbrough's very cautious and careful inclusion of qualifications such as 'conjectural,' and 'tentative and emphatically provisional', his work is condemned by some. Some of the negative reaction is undoubtedly due to its radicalness... Wansbrough's work has been embraced wholeheartedly by few and has been employed in a piecemeal fashion by many. Many praise his insights and methods, if not all of his conclusions." Gerd R. Puin's study of ancient Quran manuscripts led him to conclude that some of the Quranic texts may have been present a hundred years before Muhammad. Norman Geisler argues that the dependence of the Quran on preexisting sources is one evidence of a purely human origin.

Ibn Ishaq, an Arab Muslim historian and hagiographer who collected oral traditions that formed the basis of the important biography of Muhammad, also claimed that as a result of these discussions, the Quran was revealed addressing all these arguments – leading to the conclusion that Muhammad may have incorporated Judeo-Christian tales he had heard from other people. For example, in al-Sirah an-Nabawiyyah (an edited version of Ibn Ishaq's original work), Ibn Hishām's report "explains that the Prophet used often to sit at the hill of Marwa inviting a Christian...but they actually also would have had some resources with which to teach the Prophet."

"...saw the Prophet speaking with him, they said: "Indeed, he is being taught by Abu Fukayha Yasar." According to another version: "The apostle used often to sit at al-Marwa at the booth of a young Christian slave Jabr, slave of the Banu l-Hadrami, and they used to say: 'The one who teaches Muhammad most of what he brings is Jabr the Christian, slave of the Banu l-Hadrami."

A study of informant reports by Claude Gilliot concluded the possibility that whole sections of the Meccan Quran contains elements from or within groups possessing Biblical, post-Biblical and other sources. One such report and likely informant of Muhammad was the Christian slave mentioned in Sahih Bukhari whom Ibn Ishaq named as Jabr for which the Quran's chapter 16: 101–104 was probably revealed. Waqidi names this Christian as Ibn Qumta, with his identity and religious affiliation being contradicted in informant reports. Ibn Ishaq also recounts the story of how three Christians, Abu Haritha Ibn `Alqama, Al-`Aqib `Abdul-Masih and Al-Ayham al-Sa`id, spoke to Muhammad regarding such Christian subjects as the Trinity.

The narration of the baby Jesus speaking from the cradle can be traced back to the Arabic Infancy Gospel, and the miracle of the bringing clay birds to life being found in The Infancy Story of Thomas.

Several narratives rely on Jewish Midrash Tanhuma legends, like the narrative of Cain learning to bury the body of Abel in Surah 5:31. Richard Carrier regards this reliance on pre-Islamic Christian sources, as evidence that Islam derived from a heretical sect of Christianity.

Influence of heretical Christian sects

The Quran maintains that Jesus was not actually crucified and did not die on the cross. The general Islamic view supporting the denial of crucifixion may have been influenced by Manichaeism (Docetism), which holds that someone else was crucified instead of Jesus, while concluding that Jesus will return during the end-times. However the general consensus is that Manichaeism was not prevalent in Mecca in the 6th- & 7th centuries, when Islam developed.

Despite these views and no eyewitness accounts, most modern scholars have maintained that the Crucifixion of Jesus is indisputable.

The view that Jesus only appeared to be crucified and did not actually die predates Islam, and is found in several apocryphal gospels.

Irenaeus in his book Against Heresies describes Gnostic beliefs that bear remarkable resemblance with the Islamic view:

Another Gnostic writing, found in the Nag Hammadi library, Second Treatise of the Great Seth has a similar view of Jesus' death:

and also:

Coptic Apocalypse of Peter, likewise, reveals the same views of Jesus' death:

The Collyridians, early Christian heretical sect in pre-Islamic Arabia, whose adherents apparently worshipped the Virgin Mary, mother of Jesus, as a goddess, have become of interest in some recent Christian–Muslim religious discussions in reference to the Islamic concept of the Christian Trinity. That idea has never been part of mainstream Christian doctrine and is not clearly and unambiguously attested among any ancient Christian group, including the Collyridians.

Contradictions and abrogation
The Quran contains divine commands or policies that are ignored in Islamic law (sharia), including Q24:2, which prescribes a penalty of "100 lashes" for zina (sex outside of marriage), while sharia law—based on hadith of Muhammad—orders adulterers to be stoned to death, not lashed.
This seeming disregard of the founding work of revelation of Islam has been explained by the concept of abrogation, whereby God sometimes abrogates one (sometimes more) revelation(s)  with another—not only in the Quran but also among hadith. Naskh also holds that are Islamic laws based on verses once part of the Quran but no longer found in present-day Mus'haf (written copies of the Quran), which is the case with the stoning penalty for adultery.
A number of verses mention the issue of abrogation, the  central one being:
: "We do not abrogate a verse or cause it to be forgotten except that We bring forth [one] better than it or similar to it. Do you not know that Allah is over all things competent?"

Besides , some other examples of naskh cited by scholars are: 
These seeming contradictory commands are explained by the first verse being abrogated by the second, and the second by the last, as part of a gradual process of weening early Muslims from alcohol consumption. 
The revelation of a verse criticizing Muslim slackers in the waging of jihad, prompted a blind Muslim ('Abd Allah ibn Umm Maktum) to protest that his lack of vision prevented him from fighting. "Almost instantaneously" a revelation was sent down partially abrogating the earlier one by adding the qualifier "except the disabled".
 tells Muslim warriors, "If there be of you twenty patient believers, they will overcome two hundred" enemy. If there should be of you one hundred, they will overcome two hundred;.
Verses such as  urging followers to "turn away" from mocking unbelievers "and say, 'Peace, when Muslims were few in number, were replaced with the "Sword verse"  commanding "Fight those who (do) not believe in Allah and not in the Day the Last ... ", as Muhammad's followers grew stronger.

Among the criticisms made of the concept of abrogation is that it was developed to "remove" contradictions found in the Quran, which "abounds in repetitions and contradictions, which are not removed by the convenient theory of abrogation" (Philip Schaff); that it "poses a difficult theological problem" because it seems to suggest God was changing His mind, or has realized something He was unaware of when revealing the original verse, which is logically absurd for an eternally all-knowing deity (David S. Powers and John Burton);  and that it is suspiciously similar to the human process of "revising ... past decisions or plans" after "learning from experience and recognising mistakes" (Ali Dashti).

Muslim scholars such as Muhammad Husayn Tabatabaei argue abrogation in Quranic verses is not an indication of contradiction but of addition and supplementation. An example of the mention of impermanent commands in the Quran is Q.2:109 where — according to Tabatabaei — it clearly states the forgiveness is not permanent and soon there will be another command (through another verse) on this subject that completes the matter. Verse Q.4:15 also indicates its temporariness.

The question of why a perfect and unchangeable divine revelation would need to be abrogated, however, has led other scholars to interpret verse Q.2:106 differently than the mainstream. Ghulam Ahmed Parwez in his Exposition of the Quran writes that the abrogation Q.2:106 refers to is of the Bible/Torah, not the Quran:

Satanic verses

Some criticism of the Quran has revolved around two verses known as the "Satanic Verses". Some early Islamic histories recount that as Muhammad was reciting Sūra Al-Najm (Q.53), as revealed to him by the angel Gabriel, Satan deceived him to utter the following lines after verses 19 and 20: "Have you thought of Al-lāt and al-'Uzzā and Manāt the third, the other; These are the exalted Gharaniq, whose intercession is hoped for." The Allāt, al-'Uzzā and Manāt were three goddesses worshiped by the Meccans. These histories then say that these 'Satanic Verses' were repudiated shortly afterward by Muhammad at the behest of Gabriel.

There are numerous accounts reporting the alleged incident, which differ in the construction and detail of the narrative, but they may be broadly collated to produce a basic account.

The different versions of the story are all traceable to one single narrator Muhammad ibn Ka'b, who was two generations removed from biographer Ibn Ishaq. In its essential form, the story reports that Muhammad longed to convert his kinsmen and neighbors of Mecca to Islam. As he was reciting Sūra an-Najm, considered a revelation by the angel Gabriel, Satan tempted him to utter the following lines after verses 19 and 20:
Have ye thought upon Al-Lat and Al-'Uzzá
and Manāt, the third, the other?These are the exalted gharāniq, whose intercession is hoped for.

Allāt, al-'Uzzā and Manāt were three goddesses worshipped by the Meccans. Discerning the meaning of "gharāniq" is difficult, as it is a hapax legomenon (i.e. used only once in the text). Commentators wrote that it meant the cranes. The Arabic word does generally mean a "crane" – appearing in the singular as ghirnīq, ghurnūq, ghirnawq and ghurnayq, and the word has cousin forms in other words for birds, including "raven, crow" and "eagle".

The subtext to the event is that Muhammad was backing away from his otherwise uncompromising monotheism by saying that these goddesses were real and their intercession effective. The Meccans were overjoyed to hear this and joined Muhammad in ritual prostration at the end of the sūrah. The Meccan refugees who had fled to Abyssinia heard of the end of persecution and started to return home. Islamic tradition holds that Gabriel chastised Muhammad for adulterating the revelation, at which point  is revealed to comfort him,

Muhammad took back his words and the persecution of the Meccans resumed. Verses  were given, in which the goddesses are belittled. The passage in question, from 53:19, reads:

Have ye thought upon Al-Lat and Al-'Uzza
And Manat, the third, the other?
Are yours the males and His the females?
That indeed were an unfair division!
They are but names which ye have named, ye and your fathers, for which Allah hath revealed no warrant. They follow but a guess and that which (they) themselves desire. And now the guidance from their Lord hath come unto them.

The incident of the Satanic Verses is put forward by some critics as evidence of the Quran's origins as a human work of Muhammad. Maxime Rodinson describes this as a conscious attempt to achieve a consensus with pagan Arabs, which was then consciously rejected as incompatible with Muhammad's attempts to answer the criticism of contemporary Arab Jews and Christians, linking it with the moment at which Muhammad felt able to adopt a "hostile attitude" towards the pagan Arabs. Rodinson writes that the story of the Satanic Verses is unlikely to be false because it was "one incident, in fact, which may be reasonably accepted as true because the makers of Muslim tradition would not have invented a story with such damaging implications for the revelation as a whole". In a caveat to his acceptance of the incident, William Montgomery Watt, states: "Thus it was not for any worldly motive that Muhammad eventually turned down the offer of the Meccans, but for a genuinely religious reason; not for example, because he could not trust these men nor because any personal ambition would remain unsatisfied, but because acknowledgment of the goddesses would lead to the failure of the cause, of the mission he had been given by God." Academic scholars such as William Montgomery Watt and Alfred Guillaume argued for its authenticity based upon the implausibility of Muslims fabricating a story so unflattering to their prophet. Watt says that "the story is so strange that it must be true in essentials." On the other hand, John Burton rejected the tradition.

In an inverted culmination of Watt's approach, Burton argued the narrative of the "satanic verses" was forged, based upon a demonstration of its actual utility to certain elements of the Muslim community – namely, those elite sections of society seeking an "occasion of revelation" for eradicatory modes of abrogation. Burton's argument is that such stories served the vested interests of the status-quo, allowing them to dilute the radical messages of the Quran. The rulers used such narratives to build their own set of laws which contradicted the Quran, and justified it by arguing that not all of the Quran is binding on Muslims. Burton also sides with Leone Caetani, who wrote that the story of the "satanic verses" should be rejected not only on the basis of isnad, but because "had these hadiths even a degree of historical basis, Muhammad's reported conduct on this occasion would have given the lie to the whole of his previous prophetic activity." Eerik Dickinson also pointed out that the Quran's challenge to its opponents to prove any inconsistency in its content was pronounced in a hostile environment, also indicating that such an incident did not occur or it would have greatly damaged the Muslims.

Intended audience
Some verses of the Quran are assumed to be directed towards all of Muhammad's followers while other verses are directed more specifically towards Muhammad and his wives, yet others are directed towards the whole of humanity.
(33:28, 33:50, 49:2, 58:1, 58:9 66:3).

Other scholars argue that variances in the Quran's explicit intended audiences are irrelevant to claims of divine origin – and for example that Muhammad's wives "specific divine guidance, occasioned by their proximity to the Prophet (Muhammad)" where "Numerous divine reprimands addressed to Muhammad's wives in the Quran establish their special responsibility to overcome their human frailties and ensure their individual worthiness", or argue that the Quran must be interpreted on more than one level. (See:).

Jurisprudence
British-German professor of Arabic and Islam Joseph Schacht, in his work The Origins of Muhammadan Jurisprudence (1950) regarding the subject of law derived from the Quran, wrote:

Schacht further states that every legal tradition from the Prophet must be taken as an inauthentic and fictitious expression of a legal doctrine formulated at a later date:

What is evident regarding the compilation of the Quran is the disagreement between the companions of Muhammad (earliest supporters of Muhammad), as evidenced with their several disagreements regarding interpretation and particular versions of the Quran and their interpretative Hadith and Sunna, namely the mutawatir mushaf having come into present form after Muhammad's death. John Burton's work The Collection of the Quran further explores how certain Quranic texts were altered to adjust interpretation, in regards to controversy between fiqh (human understanding of Sharia) and madhahib.

Science in the Quran 

Some scientists among Muslim commentators, notably al-Biruni, assigned to the Quran a separate and autonomous realm of its own and held that the Quran "does not interfere in the business of science nor does it infringe on the realm of science." These medieval scholars argued for the possibility of multiple scientific explanations of the natural phenomena, and refused to subordinate the Quran to an ever-changing science. However, there are factual contradictions between the Quran and contemporary science as shown below.

Miracles 
Muslims and non-Muslims have disputed the presence of scientific miracles in the Quran. According to author Ziauddin Sardar, "popular literature known as ijaz" (miracle) has created a "global craze in Muslim societies", starting the 1970s and 1980s and now found in Muslim bookstores, spread by websites and television preachers.

An example is the verse: "So verily I swear by the stars that run and hide ..." (Q81:15–16), which proponents claim demonstrates the Quran's knowledge of the existence of black holes; or: "[I swear by] the Moon in her fullness that ye shall journey on from stage to stage" (Q84:18–19) refers, according to proponents, to human flight into outer space.

Critics argue that verses which allegedly explain modern scientific facts about subjects such as biology, the history of Earth, and evolution of human life, contain fallacies and are unscientific.

Astronomy 
Ijaz literature tends to follow a pattern of finding some possible agreement between a scientific result and a verse in the Quran. "So verily I swear by the stars that run and hide ..." (Q.81:15-16) or "And I swear by the stars' positions-and that is a mighty oath if you only knew". (Quran, 56:75-76) is declared to refer to black holes; "[I swear by] the Moon in her fullness; that ye shall journey on from stage to stage" (Q.84:18-19) refers to space travel, and thus evidence the Quran has miraculously predicted this phenomenon centuries before scientists.

While it is generally agreed the Quran contains many verses proclaiming the wonders of nature — "Travel throughout the earth and see how He brings life into being" (Q.29:20) "Behold in the creation of the heavens and the earth, and the alternation of night and day, there are indeed signs for men of understanding ..." (Q.3:190) — it is strongly doubted by Sardar and others that "everything, from relativity, quantum mechanics, Big Bang theory, black holes and pulsars, genetics, embryology, modern geology, thermodynamics, even the laser and hydrogen fuel cells, have been 'found' in the Quran".

Evolution and creation 
Quranic verses related to the origin of mankind created from dust or mud are not logically compatible with modern evolutionary theory. Although some Muslims try to reconcile evolution with the Quran by the argument from intelligent design, the Quran (and the hadiths) can be interpreted to support the idea of creationism. This led to a contribution by Muslims to the creation vs. evolution debate.

Ethics

According to some critics, the morality of the Quran, like the life story of Muhammad, appears to be a moral regression, by the standards of the moral traditions of Judaism and Christianity it says that it builds upon. The Catholic Encyclopedia, for example, states that "the ethics of Islam are far inferior to those of Judaism and even more inferior to those of the New Testament" and "that in the ethics of Islam there is a great deal to admire and to approve, is beyond dispute; but of originality or superiority, there is none." William Montgomery Watt however finds Muhammad's changes an improvement for his time and place: "In his day and generation Muhammad was a social reformer, indeed a reformer even in the sphere of morals. He created a new system of social security and a new family structure, both of which were a vast improvement on what went before. By taking what was best in the morality of the nomad and adapting it for settled communities, he established a religious and social framework for the life of many races of men."

The Sword verse:-

According to the E. J. Brill's First Encyclopaedia of Islam, 1913–1936, Volume 4, the term first applied in the Quran to unbelieving Meccans, who endeavoured "to refute and revile the Prophet". A waiting attitude towards the kafir was recommended at first for Muslims; later, Muslims were ordered to keep apart from unbelievers and defend themselves against their attacks and even take the offensive. Most passages in the Quran referring to unbelievers in general talk about their fate on the day of judgement and destination in hell.

Alexis de Tocqueville (1805–1859), a French political thinker and historian, observed:

War and peace

The Quran's teachings on matters of war and peace are topics that are widely debated. On the one hand, some critics, such as Sam Harris, interpret that certain verses of the Quran sanction military action against unbelievers as a whole both during the lifetime of Muhammad and after. Harris argues that Muslim extremism is simply a consequence of taking the Quran literally, and is skeptical about significant reform toward a "moderate Islam" in the future. On the other hand, other scholars argue that such verses of the Quran are interpreted out of context, and Muslims of the Ahmadiyya movement argue that when the verses are read in context it clearly appears that the Quran prohibits aggression, and allows fighting only in self-defense.

The author Syed Kamran Mirza has argued that a concept of 'Jihad', defined as 'struggle', has been introduced by the Quran. He wrote that while Muhammad was in Mecca, he "did not have many supporters and was very weak compared to the Pagans", and "it was at this time he added some 'soft', peaceful verses", whereas "almost all the hateful, coercive and intimidating verses later in the Quran were made with respect to Jihad" when Muhammad was in Medina .

Micheline R. Ishay has argued that "the Quran justifies wars for self-defense to protect Islamic communities against internal or external aggression by non-Islamic populations, and wars waged against those who 'violate their oaths' by breaking a treaty". Mufti M. Mukarram Ahmed has also argued that the Quran encourages people to fight in self-defense. He has also argued that the Quran has been used to direct Muslims to make all possible preparations to defend themselves against enemies.

Shin Chiba and Thomas J. Schoenbaum argue that Islam "does not allow Muslims to fight against those who disagree with them regardless of belief system", but instead "urges its followers to treat such people kindly". Yohanan Friedmann has argued that the Quran does not promote fighting for the purposes of religious coercion, although the war as described is "religious" in the sense that the enemies of the Muslims are described as "enemies of God".

Rodrigue Tremblay has argued that the Quran commands that non-Muslims under a Muslim regime, should "feel themselves subdued" in "a political state of subservience" . He also argues that the Quran may assert freedom within religion. Nisrine Abiad has argued that the Quran incorporates the offence (and due punishment) of "rebellion" into the offence of "highway or armed robbery".

George W. Braswell has argued that the Quran asserts an idea of Jihad to deal with "a sphere of disobedience, ignorance and war".

Michael David Bonner has argued that the "deal between God and those who fight is portrayed as a commercial transaction, either as a loan with interest, or else as a profitable sale of the life of this world in return for the life of the next", where "how much one gains depends on what happens during the transaction", either "paradise if slain in battle, or victory if one survives". Critics have argued that the Quran "glorified Jihad in many of the Medinese suras" and "criticized those who fail(ed) to participate in it".

Ali Ünal has claimed that the Quran praises the companions of Muhammad, for being stern and implacable against the said unbelievers, where in that "period of ignorance and savagery, triumphing over these people was possible by being strong and unyielding."

Solomon Nigosian concludes that the "Quranic statement is clear" on the issue of fighting in defense of Islam as "a duty that is to be carried out at all costs", where "God grants security to those Muslims who fight in order to halt or repel aggression".

Shaikh M. Ghazanfar argues that the Quran has been used to teach its followers that "the path to human salvation does not require withdrawal from the world but rather encourages moderation in worldly affairs", including fighting. Shabbir Akhtar has argued that the Quran asserts that if a people "fear Muhammad more than they fear God, 'they are a people lacking in sense rather than a fear being imposed upon them by God directly.

Various calls to arms were identified in the Quran by Mohammed Reza Taheri-azar, all of which were cited as "most relevant to my actions on March 3, 2006," after he committed a terrorist attack that injured 9 people.

Violence against women

Verse 4:34 of the Quran as translated by Ali Quli Qara'i reads:  

Many translations do not necessarily imply a chronological sequence, for example, Marmaduke Pickthall's, Muhammad Muhsin Khan's, or Arthur John Arberry's. Arberry's translation reads "admonish; banish them to their couches, and beat them."

The Dutch film Submission, which rose to fame outside the Netherlands after the assassination of its director Theo van Gogh by Muslim extremist Mohammed Bouyeri, critiqued this and similar verses of the Quran by displaying them painted on the bodies of abused Muslim women. Ayaan Hirsi Ali, the film's writer, said "it is written in the Koran a woman may be slapped if she is disobedient. This is one of the evils I wish to point out in the film".

Scholars of Islam have a variety of responses to these criticisms. (See An-Nisa, 34 for a fuller exegesis on the meaning of the text.) Some Muslim scholars say that the "beating" allowed is limited to no more than a light touch by siwak, or toothbrush. Some Muslims argue that beating is only appropriate if a woman has done "an unrighteous, wicked and rebellious act" beyond mere disobedience. In many modern interpretations of the Quran, the actions prescribed in 4:34 are to be taken in sequence, and beating is only to be used as a last resort.

Many Islamic scholars and commentators have emphasized that beatings, where permitted, are not to be harsh or even that they should be "more or less symbolic." According to Abdullah Yusuf Ali and Ibn Kathir, the consensus of Islamic scholars is that the above verse describes a light beating.

Some jurists argue that even when beating is acceptable under the Quran, it is still discountenanced.

Shabbir Akhtar has argued that the Quran introduced prohibitions against "the pre-Islamic practice of female infanticide" (16:58, 17:31, 81:8).

Houris

Max I. Dimont interprets that the houris described in the Quran are specifically dedicated to "male pleasure". Alternatively, Annemarie Schimmel says that the Quranic description of the houris should be viewed in a context of love; "every pious man who lives according to God's order will enter Paradise where rivers of milk and honey flow in cool, fragrant gardens and virgin beloveds await home..."

Under the Syro-Aramaic Reading of the Quran by Christoph Luxenberg, the words translating to "Houris" or "Virgins of Paradise" are instead interpreted as "Fruits (grapes)" and "high climbing (wine) bowers... made into first fruits." Luxenberg offers alternate interpretations of these Quranic verses, including the idea that the Houris should be seen as having a specifically spiritual nature rather than a human nature; "these are all very sensual ideas; but there are also others of a different kind... what can be the object of cohabitation in Paradise as there can be no question of its purpose in the world, the preservation of the race. The solution of this difficulty is found by saying that, although heavenly food, women etc.., have the name in common with their earthly equivalents, it is only by way of metaphorical indication and comparison without actual identity... authors have spiritualized the Houris."

Christians and Jews in the Quran

Jane Gerber claims that the Quran ascribes negative traits to Jews, such as cowardice, greed, and chicanery. She also alleges that the Quran associates Jews with interconfessional strife and rivalry (Quran 2:113), the Jewish belief that they alone are beloved of God, and that only they will achieve salvation (Quran 2:111). According to the Encyclopedia Judaica, the Quran contains many attacks on Jews and Christians for their refusal to recognize Muhammad as a prophet. In the Muslim view, the crucifixion of Jesus was an illusion, and thus the Jewish plots against him ended in failure. In numerous verses the Quran accuses Jews of altering the Scripture. Karen Armstrong claims that there are "far more numerous passages in the Quran" which speak positively of the Jews and their great prophets, than those which were against the "rebellious Jewish tribes of Medina" (during Muhammad's time). Sayyid Abul Ala believes the punishments were not meant for all Jews, and that they were only meant for the Jewish inhabitants that were sinning at the time. According to historian John Tolan, the Quran contains a verse which criticizes the Christian worship of Jesus Christ as God, and also criticizes other practices and doctrines of both Judaism and Christianity. Despite this, the Quran has high praise for these religions, regarding them as the other two parts of the Abrahamic trinity.

The Christian doctrine of the Trinity states that God is a single being who exists, simultaneously and eternally, as a communion of three distinct persons, the Father, the Son and the Holy Spirit. In Islam, such plurality in God is a denial of monotheism and thus a sin of shirk, which is considered to be a major 'al-Kaba'ir' sin.

In the Quran, polytheism is considered the eternal sin of shirk,  meaning that Jews and Christians, which the Quran calls polytheists (see below), will not be pardoned by God if they do not repent of shirk.

Antisemitism
The Quran states that Jews are polytheists for exalting Ezra as a son of God and for taking their rabbis as "their lords in derogation of God",() and should believe in Islam lest a punishment befalls them that turns them into “apes and pigs”.()()

Antichristianism
Like Jews, the Quran states that Christians are polytheists for exalting Jesus as a son of God and for taking their priests as their lords in derogation of God.() It also states that Christians are polytheists for believing God is three separate beings (although the Arabic word for the Trinity الثالوث does not appear anywhere within the texts).()

Hindu criticism
Hindu Swami Dayanand Saraswati gave a brief analysis of the Quran in the 14th chapter of his 19th-century book Satyarth Prakash. He calls the concept of Islam highly offensive, and doubted that there is any connection of Islam with God:

On the other hand, Mahatma Gandhi, the moral leader of the 20th-century Indian independence movement, found the Quran to be peaceful, but the history of Muslims to be aggressive, which is criticized by Muslims themselves based on Quranic consultative concept of Shura, while he claimed that Hindus have passed that stage of societal evolution:

See also
 Apostasy in Islam
 Bibliolatry
 Censorship in Islamic societies
 Criticism of Hadith
 Criticism of Islam
 Criticism of Muhammad
 Homosexuality and Islam
 Islam and antisemitism
 Islam and domestic violence
 Islamic terrorism
 Islamic views on slavery
 Islamofascism
 The Syro-Aramaic Reading Of The Koran
 Violence in the Quran
 War against Islam
 Women in Islam

Notes

References

Citations

Bibliography
 
 
 
 

 

 
 

Criticism of Islam
Quran-related controversies
Quran